Joey McLoughney (born 12 January 1988) is an Irish hurler who plays at club level with Toomevara. He is a former member of the Tipperary senior hurling team.

Playing career

McLoughney first came to prominence at juvenile and underage levels with the Toomevara club. After joining the club's top adult team while still a minor, he was part of their Munster Club Championship-winning team in 2006, while also winning two County Championship titles. McLoughney first appeared on the inter-county scene during a four-year stint with the Tipperary minor team, which culminated with him captaining the team to the All-Ireland Championship in 2006. He subsequently joined the Tipperary under-21 team and lined out in the 2008 All-Ireland under-21 final defeat by Kilkenny. McLoughney was drafted onto the Tipperary senior hurling team for the pre-season Waterford Crystal Cup in 2013 but was released from the panel shortly after. He ended his inter-county career with an All-Ireland Championship title with the Tipperary intermediate team in 2013.

Honours

Toomevara
Munster Senior Club Hurling Championship: 2006
Tipperary Senior Hurling Championship: 2006, 2006

Tipperary
All-Ireland Intermediate Hurling Championship: 2013
Munster Intermediate Hurling Championship: 2013
Munster Under-21 Hurling Championship: 2008

References

External link

 Joey McLoughney profile

1988 births
Living people
Toomevara hurlers
Tipperary inter-county hurlers